Ecphora is a genus of extinct predatory ocenebrinid murexes indigenous to the North American Eastern Seaboard from Miocene until their extinction during the Pliocene.  The common name for this genus and a group of related genera is "ecphora"(s).

Etymology 
The name "Ecphora" is Greek, meaning "bearing out." The word was originally used by Vitruvius to signify the projecture of a member or moulding of a column, and here refers to the  distinctive "T-shaped" ribs that project from the shell.

Subdivisions
As originally proposed by Petuch in 1988, Trisecphora was regarded as a subgenus of Ecphora (sensu stricto), as was the genus Latecphora. However, further study (by Petuch) of these two subgenera lead to their promotion to genera proper. However, Planecphora Petuch 2004 was originally proposed as a full genus, but was then demoted to subgenus.

Currently, Ecphora is subdivided into the subgenus Planecphora, and several species complexes.  Originally, the species of Planecphora consisted of the "Ecphora choptankensis Species Complex" before Petuch elevated the complex to genus status.

Subgenus Planecphora
Ecphora (Planecphora) turneri (Petuch, 1988) Miocene Maryland and Virginia
Ecphora (Planecphora) vokesi (Petuch, 1988) Miocene Maryland and Virginia
Ecphora (Planecphora) choptankensis (Petuch, 1988) (nominate species) Miocene Maryland and Virginia
Ecphora (Planecphora) delicata (Petuch, 1988) Miocene Maryland and Virginia
Ecphora (Planecphora) hertweckorum (Petuch, 1987) Pliocene Florida
Ecphora (Planecphora) mansfieldi (Petuch, 1989) Pliocene Florida

Ecphora (sensu stricto)

Ecphora gardnerae Species Complex
E. wardi Petuch, 1988
E. calvertensis Petuch, 1988
E. chesapeakensis Petuch, 1992
E. williamsi Ward and Gilinsky, 1988
E. conoyensis Petuch, 2004
E. asheri Petuch, 1988
E.germonae Ward and Gilinsky, 1988
E. gardnerae gardnerae Wilson, 1987(nominate subspecies = Ecphora gardneri)
E. gardnerae angusticostata Petuch, 1989
E. whiteoakensis Ward and Gilinsky, 1988
E. streami (Petuch, 1994) Pliocene
E. pachycostata (Petuch, 1989) Pliocene

Ecphora meganae Species Complex
E. mattinglyi Petuch, 2004
E. sandgatensis Petuch, 1989
E. meganae Ward and Gilinsky, 1988
E. amyae Petuch and Drolshagen, 2010
E. roxaneae Petuch, 1991

Ecphora rikeri Species Complex
E. harasewychi Petuch, 1989
E. rikeri Petuch, 1988

Ecphora quadricostata Species Complex
E. floridana Petuch, 1989
E. kochi Ward and Gilinsky, 1988
E. quadricostata quadricostata (Say, 1824 (nominate subspecies = Ecphora quadricostata)
E. quadricostata rachelae Petuch, 1988
E. striatula Petuch, 1986
E. umbilicata Petuch, 1986

Evolution
Ecphora is derived from the slightly older Trisecphora, diverging during the Langhian epoch. The oldest species is E. wardi, found in the Plum Point Member of the Calvert Formation. Later during the Miocene, daughter genera, in the form of Latecphora, and Globecphora, and Planecphora split off during the early Pliocene, persisting in a coral atoll in what is now the Everglades until the late Piacenzian epoch of the late Pliocene, when remaining species of both Ecphora and Planecphora were driven to extinction due to encroachment by new murexes invading from the south.

References

 Nomenclator Zoologicus info
 G. C. Martin. 1904. Gastropoda. Maryland Geological Survey Miocene(Text):131-269
 N. F. Sohl. 1964. Neogastropoda, Opisthobranchia, and Basommatophora from the Ripley, Owl Creek, and Prairie Bluff Formations. US Geological Survey Professional Paper 331(B):153-344
 E. J. Petuch. 1992. New ecphoras (Gastropoda: Thaididae: Ecphorinae) from the Calvert Formation of Maryland (Langhian Miocene). The Nautilus 106(2):68-71
 J. J. Sepkoski. 2002. A compendium of fossil marine animal genera. Bulletins of American Paleontology 363:1-560

External links
Maryland Geological Survey: Maryland's State Fossil Shell

Muricidae
Index fossils
Miocene gastropods
Pliocene gastropods
Langhian first appearances
Piacenzian extinctions
Prehistoric molluscs of North America
Fossil taxa described in 1843

nl:Ecphora
vi:Ecphora